Kharashibir (Khara Sheber) is a rural locality (a selo) in Mukhorshibirsky District, Republic of Buryatia, Russia. The population was 898 as of 2010. There are 6 streets.

Geography 
Kharashibir is located 14 km northeast of Mukhorshibir (the district's administrative centre) by road. Mukhorshibir is the nearest rural locality.

References 

Rural localities in Mukhorshibirsky District